Francisco Govinho Lima (born 17 April 1971) is a Brazilian former footballer who played as a midfielder. Lima generally played as a defensive or central midfielder but on several occasions he was also employed as a left midfielder.

Career
He played for São Paulo Futebol Clube in 1996, and played for Gaziantepspor in 1996/1998. He then played for FC Zürich between 1998 and 2000, and joined Serie A team Lecce during 1999/2000. One year later, he transferred to Bologna, and impressed AS Roma enough to win a move to them in 2001. Roma paid Bologna 13 billion Italian lire. He signed a 3-year contract and earned an average of 3.7 billion lire annually before tax.

He stayed in the capital for three seasons. At the age of 33, he went northward to Lokomotiv Moscow. In January 2006, he was loaned to Qatar SC, until the summer. He signed for FC Dynamo Moscow in a free transfer during the second half of the Russian season.

He then joined Brescia Calcio in January 2007, and later the San Jose Earthquakes in July 2008. However, he left them in January 2009 to move back to Italy to join Taranto.

In January 2010, Lima returned to Brazil for Nacional (AM). In the same year he played for Rio Negro (AM), another club based on his hometown. He last played for São Raimundo (AM), another Manaus based club before retiring at the age of 40. He worked as director of football at Nacional (AM) before coming out of retirement and signing for Fast Clube to play the 2016 Copa Verde as a centre back with 2006 FIFA Club World Cup winner Ediglê.

Honours

 Ferroviário (CE)
 Campeonato Cearense (1): 1994

 Roma
 Supercoppa Italiana (1): 2001

References

External links
 Profile at Brescia Calcio official website 

1971 births
Living people
People from Manaus
Afro-Brazilian sportspeople
Brazilian footballers
Brazilian expatriate footballers
A.S. Roma players
Bologna F.C. 1909 players
FC Dynamo Moscow players
FC Lokomotiv Moscow players
São Paulo FC players
U.S. Lecce players
Gaziantepspor footballers
Grasshopper Club Zürich players
FC Zürich players
Brescia Calcio players
San Jose Earthquakes players
Qatar SC players
Taranto F.C. 1927 players
Süper Lig players
Serie A players
Serie B players
Russian Premier League players
Brazilian expatriates in Italy
Expatriate footballers in Italy
Brazilian expatriates in Qatar
Expatriate footballers in Qatar
Expatriate footballers in Russia
Brazilian expatriate sportspeople in Switzerland
Expatriate footballers in Switzerland
Brazilian expatriate sportspeople in Turkey
Expatriate footballers in Turkey
Expatriate soccer players in the United States
Association football midfielders
São Raimundo Esporte Clube footballers
Sportspeople from Amazonas (Brazilian state)